Luzula pallescens is a species of perennial plant in Juncaceae family, commonly known as fen wood-rush.

Distribution
The plant is widely distributed in northern Eurasia, from Great Britain and Scandinavia, through north−Central and Eastern Europe, Eurasia, and Central Asia, to the Himalayas and Northeast Asia.

Other countries it is common in include Japan, Finland, Korea, Poland, Russia, Taiwan, and Ukraine.

Description

References

pallescens
Flora of temperate Asia
Flora of Eastern Europe
Flora of Northern Europe
Flora of the Alps
Flora of Finland
Flora of Norway
Flora of Poland
Flora of Quebec
Flora of Russia
Flora of Sweden
Plants described in 1814
Taxa named by Olof Swartz
Flora without expected TNC conservation status